Halvor Sannes Lande (born 18 November 1973) is a Norwegian rower. He competed in the men's coxless four event at the 1996 Summer Olympics.

References

External links
 

1973 births
Living people
Norwegian male rowers
Olympic rowers of Norway
Rowers at the 1996 Summer Olympics
Rowers from Oslo